Nicolaus II Bernoulli, a.k.a. Niklaus Bernoulli, Nikolaus Bernoulli (6 February 1695, Basel, Switzerland – 31 July 1726, St. Petersburg, Russia) was a Swiss  mathematician as were his father Johann Bernoulli and one of his brothers, Daniel Bernoulli.  He was one of the many prominent mathematicians in the Bernoulli family.

Work
Nicolaus worked mostly on curves, differential equations, and probability. He was a friend and contemporary of Leonhard Euler, who studied under Nicolaus' father.  He also contributed to fluid dynamics.

He was older brother of Daniel Bernoulli, to whom he also taught mathematics.  Even in his youth he had learned several languages. From the age of 13, he studied mathematics and law at the University of Basel. In 1711 he received his Master's of Philosophy; in 1715 he received a Doctorate in Law. In 1716-17 he was a private tutor in Venice. From 1719 he had the Chair in Mathematics at the University of Padua, as the successor of Giovanni Poleni. He served as an assistant to his father, among other areas, in the correspondence over the priority dispute between Isaac Newton and Leibniz, and also in the priority dispute between his father and the English mathematician Brook Taylor. In 1720 he posed the problem of reciprocal orthogonal trajectories, which was intended as a challenge for the English Newtonians. From 1723 he was a law professor at the Berner Oberen Schule. In 1725 he together with his brother Daniel, with whom he was touring Italy and France at this time, was invited by Peter the Great to the newly founded St. Petersburg Academy. Eight months after his appointment he came down with a fever and died. His professorship was succeeded in 1727 by Leonhard Euler, whom the Bernoulli brothers had recommended.  His early death cut short a promising career.

See also
 Bernoulli distribution
 Bernoulli process
 Bernoulli trial
 St. Petersburg paradox

External links

Further reading
 

1695 births
1726 deaths
Mathematical analysts
Probability theorists
Swiss Calvinist and Reformed Christians
18th-century Swiss mathematicians
Nicolaus II